Tower Theatre or Tower Theater may refer to:

Tower Theater, Philadelphia 1975, an album by Bruce Sprngsteen and the E Street Band 

or one of the following:

 Tower Theatre (Folkestone), Kent
 Tower Theatre (Los Angeles)
 Tower Theater (Miami, Florida)
 Tower Theatre (Bend, Oregon)
 Tower Theatre (Oklahoma City)
 Tower Theater (Upper Darby Township, Pennsylvania)
 Tower Theatre (Salt Lake City)
 Tower Theatre (Fresno, California)
 Tower Theatre (Sacramento, California)

See also
Tower Theatre Company

Lists of theatres